Fulmentum is a genus of sea snails, marine gastropod mollusks in the family Pseudolividae.

This is a synonym of Pseudoliva Swainson, 1840

Species
Species within the genus Fulmentum include:
 Fulmentum ancilla (Hanley, 1859): synonym of Pseudoliva ancilla Hanley, 1860
 Fulmentum sepimentum (Rang, 1832): synonym of Pseudoliva sepimentum (Rang, 1832)

References

External links
 Vermeij G. (1998). "Generic revision of the neogastropod family Pseudolividae". The Nautilus 111(2): .
  Kantor Yu.I., Fedosov A.E., Puillandre N., Bonillo C. & Bouchet P. (2017). Returning to the roots: morphology, molecular phylogeny and classification of the Olivoidea (Gastropoda: Neogastropoda). Zoological Journal of the Linnean Society. 180(3): 493-541

Pseudolividae